The 1975 Portland Timbers season was the inaugural season for the Portland Timbers, an expansion team in the now-defunct North American Soccer League. In the Timbers first year of existence, the club won the Western Division title while amassing more points than any other club in the league. In the playoffs, the Timbers needed overtime to get past the Seattle Sounders and then defeated the St. Louis Stars en route to a berth in Soccer Bowl '75. Portland lost the championship game 2–0 to fellow expansion side Tampa Bay Rowdies at Spartan Stadium in San Jose, California on August 24.

Squad 
The 1975 squad

North American Soccer League

Regular season

Western Division standings 

Pld = Matches played; W = Matches won; L = Matches lost; GF = Goals for; GA = Goals against; GD = Goal difference; Pts = PointsSource:

League results 

Source:

Postseason

Playoff bracket

Bracket

Playoff results 

Source:

References

1975
American soccer clubs 1975 season
1975 in sports in Oregon
Portland
1975 in Portland, Oregon